Oikopleura is a genus of Tunicata (sea-squirts) in the class Appendicularia. It forms a mucus house every four hours at 20 degrees Celsius. This house has a coarse mesh to keep out big particles, and a fine mesh that collects the small particles, down to the nanoplankton that includes (pelagic) bacteria.

Abandoned mucus houses sink to the deep, collecting organic particles during their descent. They make an important contribution to marine snow, since Oikopleura is abundant and is a very active filterer, using powerful strokes of its tail. Its abundance is less obvious from preserved samples (that are usually analyzed) because the gelatinous body disappears in the preservation process while leaving hardly any trace.

Species of Oikopleura have the smallest genomes in the animal kingdom, only about 75Mb.

Oikopleura contains bioluminescent species. About half of Oikopleura species are bioluminescent.

Taxonomy
 Oikopleura (Coecaria) , 1933
 Oikopleura (Coecaria) fusiformis Fol, 1872
 Oikopleura (Coecaria) fusiformis cornutogastra Aida, 1907
 Oikopleura (Coecaria) gracilis Lohmann, 1896
 Oikopleura (Coecaria) intermedia Lohmann, 1896
 Oikopleura (Coecaria) longicauda  (Vogt, 1854)
 Oikopleura (Vexillaria) Lohmann, 1933
 Oikopleura (Vexillaria) albicans  (Leuckart, 1853)
 Oikopleura (Vexillaria) caudaornata  (Fenaux & Youngbluth, 1991) 
 Oikopleura (Vexillaria) cophocerca  (Gegenbaur, 1855)
 Oikopleura (Vexillaria) dioica Fol, 1872
 Oikopleura (Vexillaria) gaussica Lohmann, 1905
 Oikopleura (Vexillaria) gorskyi Flood, 2000
 Oikopleura (Vexillaria) inflata  (Fenaux & Youngbluth, 1991)
 Oikopleura (Vexillaria) labradoriensis Lohmann, 1892
 Oikopleura (Vexillaria) parva Lohmann, 1896
 Oikopleura (Vexillaria) rufescens Fol, 1872
 Oikopleura (Vexillaria) vanhoeffeni Lohman, 1896
 Oikopleura (Vexillaria) villafrancae Fenaux, 1992

Distribution
The oikopleurids are distributed in the tropical waters of all oceans and seas of the globe, having been reported widely in the Caribbean Sea and the western coasts of the Atlantic Ocean.

Oikopleura dioica

A species of particular interest under this genus is the Oikopleura dioica, which is an anomaly among chordates. It has retained the fundamental body plan of the chordate; yet, it has lost the mechanism for retinoic acid signaling which operates during chordate development. The loss raises the question of the evolutionary constraints that have prevented similar changes in the other chordates.

Oikopleura dioica hox genes are distributed in nine locations around the genome whereas other chordates have a cluster of hox genes. Of note, this is the first chordate among the eukaryotes found to have operons.

References

External links

 Integrated Taxonomic Information System (ITIS): Oikopleura Taxonomic Serial No.: 159668
 National Center for Biotechnologu Information (NCFI): Oikopleura Taxonomy ID: 34763
 Jellieszone: Oikopleura dioica Fol, 1872 : Larvacean
 Oikopleura Genome Browser
 Merriam-Webster: Oikopleura

Videos
 Youtube: Larvacea (Oikopleura dioica)

Photos
 Flickr: Oikopleura sp. in the house

Appendicularia
Tunicate genera
Bioluminescent animals